Jamar Chess is an American music publisher. He is president and co-founder of Sunflower Entertainment Group, a music publishing firm and record label that focuses on independent Latin music and manages a catalogue of music, including work from Lionel Hampton, Count Basie, Ike Turner, Jackie Wilson, Otis Redding, Frank Sinatra, Thelonious Monk, Marvin Gaye, Alan O'Day, Duke Ellington, and Charles Stepney.

Early life
Jamar Chess is the son of Robin and Marshall Chess. His grandfather is Leonard Chess, who started Chess Records in Chicago in 1950. Chess Records was the label of artists including Chuck Berry, Etta James, Bo Diddley, Buddy Guy, John Lee Hooker, Howlin' Wolf, and Muddy Waters.  Chess's father, Marshall Chess, is a record producer who formed Rolling Stones Records in 1970, which he ran for seven years.  He helped create The Rolling Stones tongue and lip logo, and was executive producer on seven Rolling Stone albums.

As a young man, Chess worked at Arc Music Group, the publishing arm of Chess Records, managing the blues catalog. He later became creative director of the company, He also held the Creative A&R International position where he managed the company's international operations. He worked with the company's catalog and focused on remix projects, digital licensing and synchronization licensing.

Career
In 2002, Chess co-founded Sunflower Entertainment Group, a specialty music publishing house that focuses on independent Latin music and classic publishing catalogs, with Marshall Chess and Juan Carlos Barguil.  Sunflower was established under Arc Music.

Chess was featured in Billboard's annual "30 Under 30 Power Player" list for 2009.

In 2015, Chess worked with music producer Liza Richardson to include over 40 songs from Sunflower's Columbian catalog in the Netflix series Narcos. In 2016, Chess worked with Jeurys Familia of the New York Mets to create a custom walkout song, written by Dominican Bachata singer Zacarías Ferreíra.

In April 2016, Chess and business partner Juan Carlos Barguil started Spirit Music Latino, a joint venture with indie music publisher Spirit Music Group. Spirit Music Latino is a division of Spirit Music focused on Latin songwriters, artists and catalogs.

Personal life
In 2018, he married Shana Renée Scala.Together, they have a son, Jackson Leo Chess (b. 2019).

Discography

References

American music managers
American music industry executives
Living people
Year of birth missing (living people)
Place of birth missing (living people)
American people of Polish-Jewish descent
Chess family